Bacúch ( or) is a village and municipality in the Brezno District, in the Banská Bystrica Region of Slovakia.

History
In historical records the village was first mentioned in 1563 as a part of the mining district of Brezno. It belonged to the Schaffer and Gaismair families from Banská Bystrica. The nickname of Bacúch is Zázrakovo 'place of wonder'.

Genealogical resources

The records for genealogical research are available at the state archive "Statny Archiv in Banska Bystrica, Slovakia"

 Roman Catholic church records (births/marriages/deaths): 1786-1896 (parish: B), 1656–1688, 1695-1785 (parish: C)
 Census records 1869 of Bacuch are not available at the state archive.

See also
 List of municipalities and towns in Slovakia

External links
https://www.webcitation.org/5QjNYnAux?url=http://www.statistics.sk/mosmis/eng/run.html
Surnames of living people in Bacuch
Official homepage

Villages and municipalities in Brezno District